The Rural Municipality of Eldon No. 471 is a rural municipality (RM) in the Canadian province of Saskatchewan within Census Division No. 17 and  Division No. 6.

History 
The RM of Eldon No. 471 incorporated as a rural municipality on December 13, 1909. It was originally formed as Local Improvement District 24-5-3 on April 26, 1907.

Geography

Communities and localities 
The following urban municipalities are surrounded by the RM.

Towns
Maidstone

Villages
Waseca

Demographics 

Government 
The RM of Eldon No. 471 is governed by an elected municipal council and an appointed administrator that meets on the second Wednesday of every month. The reeve of the RM is Garry Taylor while its administrator is Ken E. Reiter. The RM's office is located in Maidstone.

References 

Eldon No. 471, Saskatchewan
E
Division No. 17, Saskatchewan